Alan Rogers may refer to:

Alan Rogers (bishop) (1907–2003), Bishop of Mauritius, Bishop of Fulham and Bishop of Edmonton
Alan Rogers (camping) (died 2000), camping enthusiast and publisher
Alan Rogers (footballer, born 1977), English football player for Accrington Stanley
Alan Rogers (footballer, born 1954), English football player for Plymouth Argyle and Portsmouth
Alan Rogers (football manager) (born 1924), English football manager
Alan G. Rogers (1967–2008), US Army Major, pastor, first confirmed gay fatality in Iraq
Alan R. Rogers (born 1950), American anthropologist

See also
Alan Rodgers (1959–2014), fiction writer
Allan Rogers (born 1932), British politician
Allen Rogers (footballer) (1930–2017), Australian footballer